Shubha Milana (Kannada: ಶುಭಮಿಲನ) is a 1987 Indian Kannada film,  directed by  H. R. Bhargava and produced by N. Mamatha and N. Indukala. The film stars Vishnuvardhan and Ambika in lead roles. This movie ran for more than 100 days and became a hit at the boxoffice. The film has musical score by M. Ranga Rao. The film is a remake of the Telugu movie Aalu Magalu (1977).

Cast

Vishnuvardhan as Doctor Ravi
Ambika as Ganga
Uday Huttinagedde
Nagesh Yadav
K. S. Ashwath
Ramesh Bhat 
Pramila Joshai 
Tara  
Sudha Narasimharaju
Anuradha
Rajanand 
Dinesh
Mysore Lokesh 
Jyothi
Shobha
 Master Sandesh
Phani Ramachandra

Soundtrack

Reception

References

External links
 

1987 films
1980s Kannada-language films
Films scored by M. Ranga Rao
Kannada remakes of Telugu films
Films directed by H. R. Bhargava